There are eleven time zones in Russia (within its internationally recognized borders), which currently observe times ranging from UTC+02:00 to UTC+12:00. Daylight saving time (DST) has not been used in Russia since 26 October 2014. From 27 March 2011 to 26 October 2014, permanent DST was used.


List of zones
Since 27 December 2020, the time zones are as follows:

Daylight saving time

Daylight saving time in Russia was originally introduced on 1 July [14 July, ] 1917 by a decree of the Russian Provisional Government. However, it was abandoned by a decree  of the Soviet government six months later.

Daylight saving time was re-introduced in the USSR in 1981, beginning on 1 April and ending on 1 October each year, until mid-1984, when the USSR began following European daylight saving time rules, moving clocks forward one hour at 02:00 local standard time on the last Sunday in March, and back one hour at 03:00 local daylight time on the last Sunday in September until 1995, after which the change back occurred on the last Sunday in October.

On 27 March 2011, clocks were advanced as usual, but they did not go back on 30 October 2011, effectively making Moscow Time UTC+04:00 permanently.  On 26 October 2014, following another change in the law, the clocks in most of the country were moved back one hour, but summer Daylight Time was not reintroduced; Moscow Time returned to UTC+03:00 permanently.

History

Russian Empire
In the Russian Empire, most of the nation observed solar time. From 1740s to 1867, Alaska belonged to Russia (Russian America) which used the Julian calendar which was 11 or 12 days behind the Gregorian calendar as the rest of Russia and had local times up to GMT+15:10. The westernmost area of Russia was Congress Poland, with local times down to GMT+01:10.

During the late 19th century, Moscow Mean Time was introduced on 1 January [13 January, N.S.] 1880, originally at GMT+02:30:17. 2:30:17 corresponds to 37.6166667°, the longitude of Moscow. Other parts of Russia kept solar time for several years.

Russia adopted the Gregorian calendar in 1918, when Wednesday 31 January (O.S.) was followed by Thursday 14 February (N.S.), which dropped 13 days from the calendar.

Soviet Union
After the Soviet Union was created, Moscow Time became UTC+02:00 and the various other time zones (up to UTC+12:00) were introduced throughout Russia and the rest of the Soviet Union, for example Irkutsk Time UTC+07:00 (Irkutsk has since this always been MSK+5). Between 1917 and 1922 the time was less ordered, with daylight saving time some of those years, some with two hours addition, and some of those years with one or two hours extra winter time.

On 21 June 1930, the Soviet Union advanced all clocks by one hour, effectively making the nation run on daylight saving time all year (the so-called decree time).

On 1 April 1981, 00:00:00, Oymyakonsky District changed its time zone from MSK+6 to MSK+8. The change occurred during DST effectively changing the offset from UTC+09:00 to UTC+12:00, the offset without DST was therefore changed from UTC+09:00 to UTC+11:00. 

On 1 April 1982, 00:00:00, Chukotka Autonomous Okrug changed its time zone from MSK+10 to MSK+9, thus eliminating Anadyr Time (MSK+10 or UTC+13:00 without DST). The change occurred during DST effectively changing the offset from UTC+14:00 to UTC+13:00, the offset without DST was therefore changed from UTC+13:00 to UTC+12:00.

On 27 March 1988, 02:00:00, Saratov and Volgograd oblasts changed its time zone from MSK+1 to MSK. The change occurred during DST effectively changing the offset from UTC+05:00 to UTC+04:00, the offset without DST was therefore changed from UTC+04:00 to UTC+03:00.

On 26 March 1989, Kaliningrad Oblast switched from Moscow Time to Eastern European Time, and the following areas switched to Moscow Time (thus eliminating Samara Time; MSK+1 or UTC+04:00 without DST):
 Astrakhan Oblast
 Kirov Oblast
 Kuybyshev Krai
 Ulyanovsk Oblast

Russian Federation

Russia and most republics in the Soviet Union abolished the decree time (not moving the clocks) on 31 March 1991, but Russia reversed this the following year (except Samara Oblast which was already in UTC+04:00).

On 20 October 1991, Samara Oblast changed its time zone from MSK to MSK+1 (thus reinstating Samara Time; MSK+1), so from UTC+03:00 to UTC+04:00.

On 23 May 1993, Novosibirsk Oblast changed its time zone from MSK+4 to MSK+3. The change occurred during DST effectively changing the offset from UTC+08:00 to UTC+07:00, the offset without DST was therefore changed from UTC+07:00 to UTC+06:00.

On 28 May 1995, Altai Krai and Altai Republic changed its time zone from MSK+4 to MSK+3.

On 30 March 1997, Sakhalin Oblast changed its time zone from MSK+8 to MSK+7.

In May 2002, Tomsk Oblast changed its time zone from MSK+4 to MSK+3.

The following time zone changes occurred on 28 March 2010, which, in particular, led to abolition of two of the eleven time zones.
 Chukotka Autonomous Okrug and Kamchatka Krai started using Magadan Time, thus eliminating Kamchatka Time (MSK+9 or UTC+12:00 without DST).
 Kemerovo Oblast started using Omsk Time.
 The Udmurt Republic and Samara Oblast started using Moscow Time, thus eliminating Samara Time (MSK+1 or UTC+04:00 without DST).

Although the Russian government wanted to reduce the number of time zones even further, there were protests in far-eastern Russia on the changes, including a 20,000-strong petition in support of Kamchatka returning to UTC+12:00.

Decree No. 725 of 31 August 2011 changed the UTC offset for Moscow Time and the other time zones. Moscow Time Zone began using UTC+04:00 all year around. The notions of decree time and daylight saving time were abolished, but in fact, this decree mandated permanent daylight saving time (or even double daylight saving time in regions that had not abolished the decree time).

The decree also changed the offset of some parts of the Sakha Republic from Moscow. Oymyakonsky District switched from Magadan Time (MSK+8) to Vladivostok Time (MSK+7), and the following areas switched from Vladivostok Time (MSK+7) to Yakutsk Time (MSK+6):
 New Siberian Islands
 Tomponsky District
 Ust-Maysky District

As a result of the annexation of Crimea by the Russian Federation, local authorities in the Republic of Crimea and Sevastopol decreed that clocks in the newly proclaimed Russian federal subjects should jump ahead two hours at 10 p.m. on 29 March 2014 to switch from Eastern European Time (UTC+02:00) to Moscow Time (UTC+04:00).

In July 2014, further changes were passed, which took effect on 26 October 2014. Almost all of Russia moved back one hour, so Moscow Time became UTC+03:00 again. Some areas changed offset from Moscow:
 Chukotka Autonomous Okrug and Kamchatka Krai remained on UTC+12:00 (thus reinstating Kamchatka Time, MSK+9)
 Magadan Oblast moved back two hours to UTC+10:00 (went from Magadan Time, MSK+8 to Vladivostok Time, MSK+7)
 Zabaykalsky Krai moved back two hours to UTC+08:00 (went from Yakutsk to Irkutsk Time)
 Kemerovo Oblast remained on UTC+07:00 (went from Omsk to Krasnoyarsk Time)
 Udmurtia and Samara Oblast remained on UTC+04:00 (thus reinstating Samara Time, MSK+1)

The parts of the Magadan Time zone that remained on MSK+8 were given a new time zone name, Srednekolymsk Time, UTC+11:00. Annual DST changes were not observed.

The following time zone changes occurred on 27 March 2016:
 Sakhalin Oblast moved forward one hour from UTC+10:00 to UTC+11:00 (from Vladivostok to Srednekolymsk time), except Severo-Kurilsky District, which was already in UTC+11:00 (Srednekolymsk Time)
 Zabaykalsky Krai moved forward one hour from UTC+08:00 to UTC+09:00 (from Irkutsk to Yakutsk time)
 Altai Krai and Altai Republic moved forward one hour from UTC+06:00 to UTC+07:00 (from Omsk to Krasnoyarsk time)
 Astrakhan and Ulyanovsk oblasts moved forward one hour from UTC+03:00 to UTC+04:00 (from Moscow to Samara time)

On 24 April 2016, Magadan Oblast moved forward one hour from UTC+10:00 to UTC+11:00 (from Vladivostok to Srednekolymsk time). After this change, the UTC+11:00 time zone was again called Magadan Time.

On 29 May 2016, Tomsk Oblast moved forward one hour from UTC+06:00 to UTC+07:00 (from Omsk to Krasnoyarsk time).

On 24 July 2016, Novosibirsk Oblast moved forward one hour from UTC+06:00 to UTC+07:00 (from Omsk to Krasnoyarsk time).

On 4 December 2016, Saratov Oblast moved forward one hour from UTC+03:00 to UTC+04:00 (from Moscow to Samara time).

On 28 October 2018, Volgograd Oblast moved forward one hour from UTC+03:00 to UTC+04:00 (from Moscow to Samara time), but this change was reverted on 27 December 2020.

Railway time
Until 2018, all timetables on Russian Railways (except Sakhalin railways) followed Moscow Time. From 2018 time tables follow local time.
 Airports and flights follow local time.

Tz Database

For Russia, the tz database contains several zones in the file zone.tab.

List of zones
The list below shows the 16 zones for Russia as defined in the file zone.tab of the database. The database aims to identify regions that had the same time offset rules since 1970.

Two federal subjects are contained in more than one tz zone. The Sakha Republic is divided into three: west, central, east. Sakhalin Oblast is divided into two: Sakhalin Island with Kurilsky and Yuzhno-Kurilsky districts in the Kuril Islands, and Severo-Kurilsky District in the Kuril Islands.

On the last Sunday in October 2011, daylight-saving time ended in tzdata, but all zones moved forward one hour. In other words, the clocks did not change, but the names of the time zones reverted permanently to their standard time variants and there will be no more daylight-saving time. 

If available, the change column lists the offset changes that caused a creation of a new zone in the tz database.

"Initial zone" means that in 1970 there was already a difference in time offset from the offsets in any other zone.

Deleted zones

Asia/Ulan Ude was a time zone identifier from the zone file of the tz database. The reference point was Ulan-Ude. It was added in tz version 2011e. Edition 2011i did not contain it anymore. The area remained at Asia/Irkutsk.
The contained data in zone.tab was:
 RU
 +5150+10736
 Asia/Ulan_Ude
 Moscow+05 - Buryatia

The covered area was Republic of Buryatia.

See also
 Decree time

References

External links

 Map of time zones in Russia